The 2022 Open du Pays d'Aix was a professional tennis tournament played on clay courts. It was the ninth edition of the tournament which was part of the 2022 ATP Challenger Tour. It took place in Aix-en-Provence, France between 2 and 8 May 2022.

Singles main-draw entrants

Seeds

 1 Rankings as of 25 April 2022.

Other entrants
The following players received wildcards into the singles main draw:
  Titouan Droguet
  Sascha Gueymard Wayenburg
  Jo-Wilfried Tsonga

The following players received entry into the singles main draw as alternates:
  Grégoire Barrère
  Antoine Hoang

The following players received entry from the qualifying draw:
  Mathias Bourgue
  Martín Cuevas
  Gabriel Debru
  Calvin Hemery
  Kyrian Jacquet
  Alexei Popyrin

Champions

Singles

 Benjamin Bonzi def.  Grégoire Barrère 6–2, 6–4.

Doubles

 Titouan Droguet /  Kyrian Jacquet def.  Nicolás Barrientos /  Miguel Ángel Reyes-Varela 6–2, 6–3.

References

2022 ATP Challenger Tour
2022
2022 in French tennis
May 2022 sports events in France